Ardonis filicata is a moth in the family Geometridae first described by Charles Swinhoe in 1892. It is found in the north-eastern Himalayas and Borneo and Sulawesi.

The wingspan is about 30 mm. Adults are green. The forewings have a black patch on the base of the costa and irregular black antemedial, medial and postmedial lines. The hindwings have a curved black antemedial line.

Subspecies
Ardonis filicata filicata (north-eastern Himalaya, Borneo)
Ardonis filicata mochleutes (Prout, 1958) (Sulawesi)

References

External links
Original description: Swinhoe, Charles (1892). Transactions of the Entomological Society of London: 1-2.

Moths described in 1892
Eupitheciini
Moths of Asia